Atta bisphaerica is a species of leafcutter ant, a New World ant of the subfamily Myrmicinae of the genus Atta.

See also
List of leafcutter ants

References

Atta (genus)
Insects described in 1908
Taxa named by Auguste Forel